Russell Epstein is a professor of psychology at the University of Pennsylvania, who studies neural mechanisms underlying visual scene perception, event perception, object recognition, and spatial navigation in humans. His lab studies the role of the Parahippocampal and retrosplenial cortices in determining how people orient themselves relative to their surroundings.

Education
Epstein received an undergraduate degree in physics at the University of Chicago and a Ph.D. in computer vision with Alan Yuille at Harvard.

References

Year of birth missing (living people)
Living people
University of Pennsylvania faculty
21st-century American psychologists
University of Chicago alumni
Harvard University alumni